Kleenex Girl Wonder (or Kleenexgirlwonder or Kleen Ex-Girl Wonder in Japan) is an indie rock band, originally from the suburbs of Chicago but now based in New York City.

The band's central and sole consistent member since its inception is Graham Smith (born July 14, 1979). The original backing band consisted of neighborhood friends from his hometown of Downers Grove, Illinois. This lineup consisted of Adam Blake (guitar), Rafeeq Hasan (bass), Quinn Goodwillie (guitar), Christian Goodwillie (bass) and Jeff Giba (drums).

The band of the past decade largely featured Smith on bass and vocals, Thayer McClanahan on guitar, and Matt LeMay on drums. Upon LeMay's departure following the completion of Vana Mundi (2018), the band brought in Adam Russin on drums to complete the current active trio.

After 2003, Smith released some albums under his own name, as well as some credited to both his given name and KGW. It is assured by numerous sources that no ill will or misdirection was meant by this.

All significant and currently available albums are listed in the discography below, with accreditation delineated as necessary.

Discography
 Porno Movie (1994) √KG0-3
 I'm Thinking Metric (1995) √KG0-2
 Miss Pregnant Wetnuts (1995) √KG0-69
 Old Timer Loose in Mustard Springs (1995, unreleased) √KG0-1
 Sexual Harassment (1996) √KG001
 Graham Smith Is the Coolest Person Alive (1997) √KG002
 AGAS EP (1998) √KG00333
 Ponyoak (1999) √KG003
 Ponyoak Bonus EP (1999) √KG00366
 Smith (2001) √KG004
 Why I Write Such Good Songs EP (2002) √KG0045
 After Mathematics (2002) √KG005
 Final Battle (as Graham Smith) (2004) √KG006
 CMYK (4-album box set) (2006) √KG007 (also distilled as a single release, November Brain - these releases generally credited to Graham Smith & KGW, also sometimes as Graham Smith with Herbs or just Herbs)
 Yes Boss (2008) (as Graham Smith & KGW) √KG008
 Mrs. Equitone (2009) (as KGW) √KG009
 Accept the Mystery (2010) (as Graham Smith) √KG010
 Secret Thinking (2011) √KG011
 Let it Buffer (2013) √KG012
 The Comedy Album (2016) √KG013
 Vana Mundi (2018) √KG014
 White Lacuna (2018) √KG015

References

External links
 
 Kleenex Girl Wonder music site

Indie rock musical groups from Illinois
Alternative rock groups from Chicago